"Christmas in New York" is a Christmas song written by Billy Butt at the piano of the Church of Sweden in New York in 1979. It was recorded by John Wesley Shipp and released as a single in 1982, with "The Christmas Song" on its B-side.

The English-language version was performed annually between 1986 and 2002 by The Rockettes during the Radio City Christmas Spectacular in New York City. Lyrically, the song describes New York City in Christmas time. It was recorded by Loa Falkman, as "It's Christmas in New York", on his 1990 Christmas album Julstämning. US jazz singer Linda Bianchi covered it on her 2009 Christmas album, Christmas in New York.

The Swedish-language version, recorded by the Glennmarks Family on the 1983 holiday album, Från advent till jul, is called "Jul i Gamla stan", with lyrics by Monica Forsberg reflecting Christmas in Stockholm's gamla stan. It was covered by (among others) Sten & Stanley (1986), Jan Malmsjö (1987), Hasse Andersson (1996) and Cyndee Peters (1986).

References

1979 songs
Sten & Stanley songs
American Christmas songs
Songs written by Monica Forsberg
Hasse Andersson songs
Swedish Christmas songs
Songs about New York City